Argo District ( / ) is one of the 28 districts in Badakhshan province, Afghanistan. It was created in 2005 from part of Fayzabad District and is home to approximately 45,000 residents.

On 2 May 2014, there were two mudslides in the district occurring on the side of a mountain, affecting the villages of either Aab Barik or Hargu.

See also 
 Fayzabad District

References 

Districts of Badakhshan Province